WTOO-CD (channel 50) is a low-power, Class A television station in Johnstown, Pennsylvania, United States, affiliated with the digital multicast network Heroes & Icons. Owned by Sonshine Family Television, it is a sister station to Bethlehem, Pennsylvania–based WBPH-TV (channel 60). WTOO-CD's transmitter is located northwest of Johnstown, Pennsylvania in Laurel Ridge State Park along the Cambria–Westmoreland county line.

History
WTOO-CD was owned by Benjamin Perez of Abacus Television until it was sold, along with four other TV stations, to Fifth Street Enterprises LLC in April 2015.

On April 12, 2021, it was announced that WTOO-CD would be sold to Zebra Media, a sister company to Sonshine Family Television, for $450,000; the sale was completed on June 1.

Subchannels
The station's digital signal is multiplexed:

References

External links

TOO-CD
Television channels and stations established in 1997
1997 establishments in Pennsylvania
Low-power television stations in the United States
Innovate Corp.
Heroes & Icons affiliates
Start TV affiliates
Decades (TV network) affiliates
Movies! affiliates
GetTV affiliates
True Crime Network affiliates